Adil Mehmood (born 31 December 1988) is a Hong Kong cricketer.  Mehmood is a right-handed batsman who bowls right-arm medium pace.

Mehmood was a part of the Hong Kong squad for the 2011 World Cricket League Division Three, but did not feature.  His debut for Hong Kong came in the 2011 World Cricket League Division Two, he made a single List A appearance against the United Arab Emirates.  In this match he bowled 3 wicket-less overs, while with the bat he remained unbeaten on 1 at the end of Hong Kong's innings.

He made his Twenty20 International debut for Hong Kong against Afghanistan in the 2016 Asia Cup Qualifier on 22 February 2016.

References

External links
Adil Mehmood at ESPNcricinfo
Adil Mehmood at CricketArchive

1988 births
Living people
Hong Kong people
Hong Kong cricketers
Hong Kong Twenty20 International cricketers
Cricketers at the 2014 Asian Games
Asian Games competitors for Hong Kong